Hasan Jun (also Romanized as Ḩasan Jūn) is a village in Miyan Taleqan Rural District, in the Central District of Taleqan County, Alborz Province, Iran. At the 2006 census, its population was 741, in 222 families.

References 

Populated places in Taleqan County